The Phantom of the Opera is a 1925 American silent horror film adaptation of Gaston Leroux's 1910 novel Le Fantôme de l'Opéra, directed by Rupert Julian and starring Lon Chaney in the title role of the deformed Phantom who haunts the Paris Opera House, causing murder and mayhem in an attempt to make the woman he loves a star. The film remains most famous for Chaney's ghastly, self-devised make-up, which was kept a studio secret until the film's premiere. The picture also features Mary Philbin, Norman Kerry, Arthur Edmund Carewe, Gibson Gowland, John St. Polis and Snitz Edwards. The last surviving cast member was Carla Laemmle (died 2014), niece of producer Carl Laemmle, who played a small role as a "prima ballerina" in the film when she was about 15 years old. The film was released on September 6, 1925, premiering at the Astor Theatre in New York. The film's final budget was $632,357.

In 1953, the film entered the public domain in the United States because the claimants did not renew its copyright registration in the 28th year after publication.

Plot
Based on the general release version of 1925, which has additional scenes and sequences in different order than the existing reissue print.

The film opens with the debut of the new season at the Paris Opera House, with a production of Gounod's Faust. Comte Philippe de Chagny and his brother, the Vicomte Raoul de Chagny are in attendance. Raoul is there only in the hope of hearing his sweetheart Christine Daaé sing. Christine has made a sudden rise from the chorus to understudy for Mme. Carlotta, the prima donna. Raoul visits her in her dressing room during an interval and makes his intentions known that he wishes for Christine to resign and marry him, but she refuses to let their relationship get in the way of her career.

At the height of the most prosperous season in the Opera's history, the management suddenly resign. As they leave, they tell the new managers about the Opera Ghost, a phantom who is "the occupant of box No. 5".

After the performance, the ballerinas are disturbed by the sight of a mysterious man in a fez prowling down in the cellars and they wonder if he could be the Phantom. Meanwhile, Mme. Carlotta, the prima donna, has received a letter from "The Phantom," demanding that Christine sing the role of Marguerite the following night, threatening dire consequences if his demands are not met. In Christine's dressing room, an unseen voice warns Christine that she must take Carlotta's place and that she is to think only of her career and her master.

The following day, in a garden near the Opera House, Raoul meets Christine and asks her to reconsider his offer. Christine admits that she has been tutored by a divine voice, the "Spirit of Music," and that it is now impossible to stop her career. Raoul tells her that he thinks someone is playing a joke on her and she storms off in anger.

That evening, Christine takes Carlotta's place in the opera. During the performance, the managers enter Box 5 and are startled to see a shadowy figure seated there, who disappears when they are not looking. Later, Simon Buquet finds the body of his brother, stagehand Joseph Buquet, hanging by a noose and vows vengeance. Carlotta receives another peremptory note from the Phantom. Once again, he demands that she say she is ill and let Christine take on her role. The managers get a similar note, reiterating that if Christine does not sing, they will present Faust in a house with a curse on it.

The following evening, despite the Phantom's warnings, a defiant Carlotta appears as Marguerite. During the performance, the large crystal chandelier hanging from the ceiling is dropped onto the audience by the Phantom, crushing some people to death. Christine enters a secret door behind the mirror in her dressing room, descending into the lower depths of the Opera. She meets the Phantom, who introduces himself as Erik and declares his love; Christine faints and Erik carries her to an underground suite fabricated for her comfort. The next day, she finds a note from Erik telling her that she is free to come and go as she pleases, but that she must never look behind his mask. As the Phantom is preoccupied playing his organ, Christine sneaks up behind him and playfully tears off his mask, revealing his deformed skull-like face. Enraged, the Phantom declares that she is now his prisoner. She pleads with him to let her sing again and he relents, allowing her to visit the surface one last time if she promises not to see Raoul again.

Released, Christine makes a rendezvous with Raoul at the annual masked-ball, at which the Phantom appears in the guise of Poe's "Red-Death". Raoul and Christine flee to the roof of the Opera House, where she tells him about her experiences. Unbeknownst to them, the Phantom is listening nearby atop a statue. Raoul swears to whisk Christine safely away to London with him following her next performance. As they leave the roof, the mysterious man with the fez approaches them. Aware that the Phantom is waiting downstairs, he leads Christine and Raoul to another exit.

The next night, during her performance, Christine is kidnapped by the Phantom. Raoul rushes to her dressing room and meets the man in the fez again, who reveals himself to be Inspector Ledoux, a secret policeman who has been tracking Erik since he escaped as a prisoner from Devil's Island. Ledoux reveals the secret door in Christine's room and the two men enter the catacombs of the Opera House in an attempt to rescue Christine. They fall into the Phantom's dungeon, a torture chamber of his design. Philippe has also found his way into the catacombs looking for his brother. Philippe is drowned by Erik, who returns to his lair to find the other two men trapped in the torture chamber.

The Phantom subjects the two prisoners to intense heat; they manage to escape the chamber by opening a trap door in the floor. In the chamber below, the Phantom shuts a gate, locking them in with barrels full of gunpowder. He causes the room to flood. Christine begs the Phantom to save Raoul, promising him anything in return, even becoming his wife. At the last second, the Phantom opens a trapdoor in his floor through which Raoul and Ledoux are saved.

A mob led by Simon Buquet infiltrates the Phantom's lair. As the mob approaches, the Phantom attempts to flee with Christine in a carriage. While Raoul saves Christine, the Phantom is beaten to death by the mob and thrown into the River Seine. In a brief epilogue, Raoul and Christine are shown on their honeymoon in Viroflay.

Cast

Pre-production

In 1922, Carl Laemmle, the president of Universal Pictures, took a vacation to Paris. During his vacation Laemmle met the author Gaston Leroux, who was working in the French film industry. Laemmle mentioned to Leroux that he admired the Paris Opera House. Leroux gave Laemmle a copy of his 1910 novel The Phantom of the Opera. Laemmle read the book in one night and bought the film rights as a vehicle for actor Lon Chaney. Production was scheduled for late 1924 at Universal Studios.

The filmmakers were unfamiliar with the layout of the Paris Opera House and consulted Ben Carré, a French art director who had worked at the Opera and was familiar with Leroux’s novel. He said Leroux’s depiction of the Opera cellars was based more on imagination than fact. Carré created twenty-four detailed charcoal sketches of the back and below-stage areas of the Opera, which the filmmakers replicated. Carré was in Europe when shooting began and had nothing more to do with the project; not until he was shown a print of the film in the 1970s did he realize his designs had been used.

The screenplay was written by Elliot J. Clawson, who had worked as the scenario writer of director Rupert Julian since 1916. His first script was a close adaptation of Leroux and included scenes from the novel that never appeared in the released film, such as the Phantom summoning Christine to her father's grave in Brittany, where he poses in the cemetery as the "Angel of Music" and plays "The Resurrection of Lazarus" on his violin at midnight. The scene was filmed by Rupert Julian but excised after he left the project.

Inspired by the novel, Clawson added a lengthy flashback to Persia, where Erik (the Phantom) served as a conjurer and executioner in the court of a depraved Sultana, using his punjab lasso to strangle prisoners. Falling from her favor, Erik was condemned to be eaten alive by ants. He was rescued by the Persian (the Sultana’s chief of police, who became "Inspector Ledoux" in the final version of the film), but not before the ants had consumed most of his face. The flashback was eliminated during subsequent story conferences, possibly for budgetary reasons. Instead, a line of dialogue was inserted to explain that Erik had been the chief torturer and inquisitor during the Paris Commune, when the Opera served as a prison, with no explanation of his damaged face.

The studio considered the novel's ending too low-key, but Clawson's third revised script retained the scene of Christine giving the Phantom a compassionate kiss. He is profoundly shaken and moans "Even my own mother would never kiss me." A mob approaches led by Simon (the brother of a stagehand who was murdered earlier by the Phantom). Erik flees the Opera House with Christine. He takes over a coach, which overturns thanks to his reckless driving, and then escapes the mob by scaling a bridge with the aid of his strangler's lasso. Waiting for him at the top is Simon, who cuts the lasso. The Phantom suffers a deadly fall. His dying words are "All I wanted...was to have a wife like anybody else...and to take her out on Sundays."

The studio remained dissatisfied. In another revised ending, Erik and Christine flee the mob and take refuge in her house. Before entering, Erik cringes "as Satan before the cross." Inside her rooms, he is overcome and says he is dying. He asks if she will kiss him and proposes to give her a wedding ring, so Christine can give it to Raoul. The Persian, Simon, and Raoul all burst into the house. Christine tells them Erik is ill; he slumps dead to the floor, sending the wedding ring rolling across the carpet. Christine sobs and flees to the garden; Raoul follows to console her.

Production

Production began in mid-October and did not go smoothly. According to director of photography Charles Van Enger, Chaney and the rest of the cast and crew had strained relations with director Rupert Julian. Eventually the star and director stopped talking, so Van Enger served as a go-between. He would report Julian's directions to Chaney, who responded "Tell him to go to hell." As Van Enger remembered, "Lon did whatever he wanted."

Rupert Julian had become Universal’s prestige director by completing the Merry-Go-Round (1923) close to budget, after original director Eric von Stroheim had been fired. But on the set of The Phantom of the Opera his directorial mediocrity was obvious to the crew. According to Van Enger, Julian had wanted the screen to go black after the chandelier fell on the Opera audience. Van Enger ignored him and lit the set with a soft glow, so the horrific aftermath of the fall would be visible to the film audience.

The ending changed yet again during filming. The scripted chase scene through Paris was discarded in favor of an unscripted and more intimate finale. To save Raoul, Christine agrees to wed Erik and she kisses his forehead. Erik is overcome by Christine’s purity and his own ugliness. The mob enters his lair under the Opera House, only to find the Phantom slumped dead over his organ, where he had been playing his composition Don Juan Triumphant.

By mid-November 1924, the majority of Chaney’s scenes had been filmed. Principal photography was completed just before the end of the year, with 350,000 feet of negative exposed. Editor Gilmore Walker assembled a rough cut of nearly four hours. The studio demanded a length of no more than 12 reels.

A score was prepared by Joseph Carl Breil. No information about the score survives other than Universal's release: "Presented with augmented concert orchestra, playing the score composed by J. Carl Briel, composer of music for The Birth of a Nation". The exact quote from the opening day full-page ad in the Call-Bulletin read: "Universal Weekly claimed a 60-piece orchestra. Moving Picture World reported that 'The music from Faust supplied the music [for the picture].

The first cut of the film was previewed in Los Angeles on January 7 and 26, 1925. Audience reaction was extremely negative and summed up by the complaint "There's too much spook melodrama. Put in some gags to relieve the tension." By March the studio had decided against the ending and decided the Phantom should not be redeemed by a woman's kiss: "Better to have kept him a devil to the end." The "redemptive" ending is now lost, with only a few frames still surviving.

The New York premiere was cancelled, and the film was rushed back into production, with a new script that focused more on Christine’s love life. It is unknown whether Rupert Julian walked away from the production or was fired; in any case, his involvement with the film had ended. To salvage the film, Universal called upon the journeymen of its Hoot Gibson western unit, who worked cheaply and quickly.

Edward Sedgwick (later the director of Buster Keaton's 1928 film The Cameraman) was then assigned by producer Laemmle to direct a reshoot of the bulk of the film. Raymond L. Schrock and original screenwriter Elliot Clawson wrote new scenes at the request of Sedgewick. The film was then changed from the dramatic thriller that was originally made into more of a romantic comedy with action elements. Most of the new scenes depicted added subplots, with Chester Conklin and Vola Vale as comedic relief to the heroes, and Ward Crane as the Russian Count Ruboff dueling with Raoul for Christine's affection. This version was previewed in San Francisco on April 26, 1925, and did not do well at all, with the audience booing it off of the screen. "The story drags to the point of nauseam", one reviewer stated.

The third and final version resulted from Universal holdovers Maurice Pivar and Lois Weber editing the production down to nine reels. Most of the Sedgwick material was removed, except for the ending, with the Phantom being hunted by a mob and then being thrown into the Seine River. Much of the cut Julian material was edited back into the picture, though some important scenes and characters were not restored. This version, containing material from the original 1924 shooting and some from the Sedgwick reworking, was then scheduled for release. It debuted on September 6, 1925, at the Astor Theatre in New York City. It premiered on October 17, 1925, in Hollywood, California. The score for the Astor opening was to be composed by Professor Gustav Hinrichs. However, Hinrichs' score was not prepared in time, so instead, according to Universal Weekly, the premiere featured a score by Eugene Conte, composed mainly of "French airs" and the appropriate Faust cues. No expense was spared at the premiere; Universal even had a full organ installed at the Astor for the event. (As it was a legitimate house, the Astor theater used an orchestra, not an organ, for its music.)

Makeup
Following the success of The Hunchback of Notre Dame in 1923, Chaney was once again given the freedom to create his own makeup, a practice which became almost as famous as the films he starred in.

Chaney commented "In The Phantom of the Opera, people exclaimed at my weird make-up. I achieved the Death's Head of that role without wearing a mask. It was the use of paints in the right shades and the right places—not the obvious parts of the face—which gave the complete illusion of horror...It’s all a matter of combining paints and lights to form the right illusion."

Chaney used a color illustration of the novel by Andre Castaigne as his model for the phantom’s appearance. He raised the contours of his cheekbones by stuffing wadding inside his cheeks. He used a skullcap to raise his forehead height several inches and accentuate the bald dome of the Phantom's skull. Pencil lines masked the join of the skullcap and exaggerated his brow lines. Chaney then glued his ears to his head and painted his eye sockets black, adding white highlights under his eyes for a skeletal effect. He created a skeletal smile by attaching prongs to a set of rotted false teeth and coating his lips with greasepaint. To transform his nose, Chaney applied putty to sharpen its angle and inserted two loops of wire into his nostrils. Guide-wires hidden under the putty pulled his nostrils upward. According to cinematographer CharlesVan Enger, Chaney suffered from his make-up, especially the wires, which sometimes made him "bleed like hell."

When audiences first saw the movie, they were said to have screamed or fainted during the scene where Christine pulls the concealing mask away, revealing his skull-like features to the audience.

Chaney's appearance as the Phantom in the film has been the most accurate depiction of the title character based on the description given in the novel, where the Phantom is described as having a skull-like face with a few wisps of black hair on top of his head. As in the novel, Chaney's Phantom has been naturally deformed since birth, rather than having been disfigured by acid or fire, as in later adaptations of The Phantom of the Opera.

Soundstage 28

Producer Laemmle commissioned the construction of a set of the Paris Opera House. Because it would have to support hundreds of extras, the set became the first to be created with steel girders set in concrete. For this reason it was not dismantled until 2014. Stage 28 on the Universal Studios lot still contained portions of the opera house set, and was the world's oldest surviving structure built specifically for a movie, at the time of its demolition. It was used in hundreds of movies and television series. In preparation for the demolition of Stage 28, the Paris Opera House set went through a preservation effort and was placed into storage. Stage 28 was completely demolished on September 23, 2014.

Reception

Initial response
Initial critical response for the film was mixed.
Mordaunt Hall of The New York Times gave the film a positive review as a spectacle picture, but felt that the story and acting may have been slightly improved. TIME praised the sets but felt the picture was "only pretty good".
Variety wrote, "The Phantom of the Opera is not a bad film from a technical viewpoint, but revolving around the terrifying of all inmates of the Grand Opera House in Paris by a criminally insane mind behind a hideous face, the combination makes a welsh rarebit look foolish as a sleep destroyer."

"THE PHANTOM OF THE OPERA is an ultra fantastic melodrama, an ambitious production in which there is much to marvel at in the scenic effects...Lon Chaney impersonates the Phantom. It is a role suited to his liking, and one which he handles with a certain skill, a little exaggerated at times, but none the less compelling...The most dramatic touch is where Christine in the cellar abode is listening to the masked Phantom as he plays the organ. Then she steals up behind him and...suddenly snatches the mask from the Phantom's face...In the theatre last night a woman behind us stifled a scream when this happened."---The New York Times

"The story has been produced on a stupendous scale. Among the sets are those representing the interior of the famed Opera House...and they are said to be authentic in every detail. This effect has also been enhanced by presenting many of the scenes in natural color...Obviously the title role was one for Lon Chaney and he gives a superb performance. Here was another chance to distinguish himself as an unrivaled artist in character make-up and he has done just that." ---Moving Picture World

"Universal has turned out another horror. This newest of U specials is probably the greatest inducement to nightmare that has yet been screened...Lon Chaney is again the "goat" in the matter, no matter if it is another tribute to his character acting. His makeup as the hunchback within the Notre Dame Cathedral was morbid enough, but this is infinitely worse, as in this instance his body is normal with a horrible face solely relied upon for the effect...It's impossible to believe there are a majority of picturegoers who prefer this revolting sort of a tale on the screen." ---Variety

"If you have been looking for a thriller, the kind that will make your patrons' hair stand on end, The Phantom of the Opera is the one...Mr. Lon Chaney's role is terrible; the make-up of his face is hideous; but he is fascinating." ---Harrison's Reports

"Entertainment of the most shuddery, gruesome kind. There are spectral ominous sets, a coffin, horrors a'plenty. But as a whole, it disappointed us...Chaney is, as usual, amazing and powerful." ---Movie Magazine

Modern response
Roger Ebert awarded the film four out of four stars, writing "It creates beneath the opera one of the most grotesque places in the cinema, and Chaney's performance transforms an absurd character into a haunting one." Adrian Warren of PopMatters gave the film 8/10 stars, summarizing, "Overall, The Phantom of the Opera is terrific: unsettling, beautifully shot and imbued with a dense and shadowy Gothic atmosphere. With such a strong technical and visual grounding it would have been difficult for Chaney to totally muck things up, and his performance is indeed integral, elevating an already solid horror drama into the realms of legendary cinema." Time Out gave the film a mostly positive review, criticizing the film's "hobbling exposition", but praised Chaney's performance as being the best version of the title character, as well as the film's climax.

TV Guide gave the film 4/5 stars, stating, "One of the most famous horror movies of all time, The Phantom of the Opera still manages to frighten after more than 60 years." The site's critical consensus reads, "Decades later, it still retains its ability to scare -- and Lon Chaney's performance remains one of the benchmarks of the horror genre."

1929 reissue with sound
After the successful introduction of sound pictures during the 1928–29 movie season, Universal announced that they had secured the rights to a sequel to The Phantom of the Opera from the Gaston Leroux estate. Entitled The Return of the Phantom, the picture would have sound and be in color. Universal could not use Chaney in the film as he was now under contract at MGM.

Universal later scrapped the sequel, and instead opted to reissue The Phantom of the Opera with a new synchronized score and sound effects track, as well as a few new dialog sequences. Directors Ernst Laemmle and Frank McCormick reshot a little less than half of the picture with sound during August 1929. The footage reused from the original film was scored with music arranged by Joseph Cherniavsky, and sound effects. Mary Philbin and Norman Kerry reprised their roles for the sound reshoot, and Edward Martindel, George B. Williams, Phillips Smalley, Ray Holderness, and Edward Davis were added to the cast to replace actors who were unavailable. Universal was contractually unable to loop Chaney's dialogue, so another character was introduced who acts as a messenger for the Phantom in some scenes. Because Chaney's talkie debut was eagerly anticipated by filmgoers, advertisements emphasized, "Lon Chaney's portrayal is a silent one!"

The sound version of Phantom opened on February 16, 1930, and grossed another million dollars. This version of the film is lost because it was burned in a fire in 1948, although the soundtrack discs survive.

The success of The Phantom of the Opera inspired Universal to finance the production of a long string of horror films through to the 1950s, starting with the base stories of Dracula (1931), Frankenstein (1931), The Mummy (1932), The Invisible Man (1933) and The Wolf Man (1941), and continuing with numerous sequels to all five films.

Differences from the novel
Although this particular adaptation is often considered the most faithful, it contains some significant plot differences from the original novel.

In the movie, M. Debienne and M. Poligny transfer ownership of the Opera to M. Montcharmin and M. Richard, while in the novel they are simply the old and new managers.

The character of Ledoux is not a mysterious Persian and is no longer a onetime acquaintance of the Phantom. He is now a French detective of the Secret Police. This character change was not originally scripted; it was made during the title card editing process.

The Phantom has no longer studied in Persia in his past. Rather, he is an escapee from Devil's Island and an expert in "the Black Arts".

As described in the "Production" section of this article, the filmmakers initially intended to preserve the original ending of the novel, and filmed scenes in which the Phantom dies of a broken heart at his organ after Christine leaves his lair. Because of the preview audience's poor reaction, the studio decided to change the ending to a more exciting chase sequence. Edward Sedgwick was hired to provide a climactic chase scene, with an ending in which the Phantom, after having saved Ledoux and Raoul, kidnaps Christine in Raoul's carriage. He is hunted down and cornered by an angry mob, who beat him to death and throw him into the Seine.

Preservation and home video status

The finest quality print of the film existing was struck from an original camera negative for George Eastman House in the early 1950s by Universal Pictures. The original 1925 version survives only in 16mm "Show-At-Home" prints created by Universal for home movie use in the 1930s. There are several versions of these prints, but none of them are complete. All are from the original domestic camera negative.

Because of the better quality of the Eastman House print, many home video releases have opted to use it as the basis of their transfers. This version has singer Mary Fabian in the role of Carlotta. In the reedited version, Virginia Pearson, who played Carlotta in the 1925 film, is credited and referred to as "Carlotta's Mother" instead. Most of the silent footage in the 1929 version is actually from a second camera, used to photograph the film for foreign markets and second negatives; careful examination of the two versions shows similar shots are slightly askew in composition in the 1929 version. In 2009, ReelClassicDVD issued a special edition multi-disc DVD set which included a matched shot side-by-side comparison of the two versions, editing the 1925 Show-At-Home print's narrative and continuity to match the Eastman House print.

For the 2003 Image Entertainment–Photoplay Productions two-disc DVD set, the 1929 soundtrack was reedited in an attempt to fit the Eastman House print as best as possible. However, there are some problems with this attempt. There is no corresponding "man with lantern" sequence on the sound discs. While the "music and effect" reels without dialogue seem to follow the discs fairly closely, the scenes with dialogue (which at one point constituted about 60% of the film) are generally shorter than their corresponding sequences on the discs. Also, since the sound discs were synchronized with a projection speed of 24 frames per second (the established speed for sound film), and the film on the DVD is presented at a slower frame rate (to reproduce natural speed), the soundtrack on the DVD set has been altered to run more slowly than the originally recorded speed. A trailer for the sound reissue, included for the first time on the DVD set, runs at the faster sound film speed, with the audio at the correct pitch.

On November 1, 2011, Image Entertainment released a new Blu-ray version of Phantom, produced by Film Preservation Associates, the film preservation company owned by David Shepard.

On January 10, 2012, Shadowland Productions released The Phantom of the Opera: Angel of Music Edition, a two-disc DVD set featuring a newly recorded dialogue track with sound effects and an original musical score. The film was also reedited, combining elements from the 1925 version with the 1929 sound release. A 3D anaglyph version is included as an additional special feature.

Eastman House print mystery

It is uncertain for what purpose the negative used to strike the Eastman House print was produced, as it includes footage from the 1929 sound reissue, and shows few signs of wear or damage.

For unknown reasons, an opening prologue showing a man with a lantern has been added—using a single continuous take—but no corresponding title cards or dialogue survive. This shot seems to have been a talking sequence, but it shows up in the original 1925 version, shorter in duration and using a different, close-up shot of the man with the lantern. Furthermore, the opening title sequence, the lantern man, the footage of Mary Fabian performing as Carlotta, and Mary Philbin's opera performances are photographed at 24 frames per second (sound film speed), and therefore were shot after the movie's original release. It is possible that the lantern man is meant to be Joseph Buquet, but the brief remaining close-up footage of this man from the 1925 version does not appear to be of Bernard Siegel, who plays Buquet. The man who appears in the reshot footage could be a different actor as well, but since there is no close-up of the man in this version, and the atmospheric lighting partially obscures his face, it is difficult to be certain.

While it was common practice to simultaneously shoot footage with multiple cameras for prints intended for domestic and foreign markets, the film is one of few for which footage of both versions survives (others include Buster Keaton's Steamboat Bill, Jr. and Charlie Chaplin's The Gold Rush). Comparisons of the two versions (both in black and white and in color) yield:
 Footage of most of the scenes shot from two slightly different angles
 Different takes for similar scenes
 24 fps sound scenes replacing silent scene footage
 Variations in many rewritten dialogue and exposition cards, in the same font

Some possibilities regarding the negative's intended purpose are:
 It is an International Sound Version for foreign markets.
 It is a silent version for theaters not yet equipped with sound in 1930.
 It is a negative made for Universal Studios' reference.

International sound version

"International sound versions" were sometimes made of films which the producing companies judged not to be worth the expense of reshooting in a foreign language. These versions were meant to cash in on the talkie craze; by 1930 anything with sound did well at the box office, while silent films were largely ignored by the public. International sound versions were basically part-talkies, and were largely silent except for musical sequences. Since the films included synchronized music and sound effect tracks, they could be advertised as sound pictures, and therefore capitalize on the talkie craze in foreign markets without the expense of reshooting scenes with dialogue in foreign languages.

To make an international version, the studio would simply replace any spoken dialogue in the film with music, and splice in some title cards in the appropriate language. Singing sequences were left intact, as well as any sound sequences without dialogue.

The surviving sound discs of The Phantom of the Opera belong to the domestic release, but do not synchronize with the dialogue portions of the film, which have been abbreviated on the Eastman House print. However, there is no record of the content of the international version of The Phantom, nor even of the existence of such a version. Furthermore, for international sound versions, one negative was generally made for all of Europe, sent overseas, and not returned. Additionally, the Eastman House print shows no signs of negative wear that would be consistent with that of a negative printed for multiple countries.

Silent version
During the transition to sound in 1930, it was not uncommon for two versions of a picture, one silent and one sound, to play simultaneously (particularly for a movie from Universal, which kept a dual-format policy longer than most studios). One possibility is that the Eastman House print is actually a silent version of the reissued film, made for theaters not yet equipped with sound.

However, according to trade journals of the time, no silent reissue was available. Harrison's Reports, which was always careful to specify whether or not a silent version of a movie was made, specifically stated that "there will be no silent version." Furthermore, by 1930, fewer exhibitors were booking completely silent films, and this had forced all of the major studios to add soundtracks and dialogue sequences to all of their major releases that had previously been intended for release as silent pictures. Studios no longer expended much time or money on silent versions, which were meant to be shown in rural areas where theaters could not yet afford the conversion to sound. Nevertheless, if the extant print is a silent version, it would explain why Universal still had it and also the lack of wear on the negative from which it was struck.

Color preservation

According to Harrison's Reports, when the film was originally released, it contained 17 minutes of color footage; this footage was retained in the 1930 part-talking version. Technicolor's records show 497 feet of color footage. Judging from trade journals and reviews, all of the opera scenes of Faust as well as the "Bal Masqué" scene were shot in Process 2 Technicolor (a two-color system). Prizmacolor sequences were also shot for the "Soldier's Night" introduction. Until recently, only the "Bal Masqué" scene survived in color; however in 2020, color footage of the ballet scene surfaced on YouTube. In the scene on the rooftop of the opera, the Phantom's cape was colored red, using the Handschiegl color process. This effect has been replicated by computer colorization in the 1996 restoration by Kevin Brownlow's Photoplay Productions.

As with many films of the time, black-and-white footage was tinted various colors to provide mood. These included amber for interiors, blue for night scenes, green for mysterious moods, red for fire, and yellow (sunshine) for daylight exteriors.

Legacy
In 1998 The Phantom of the Opera was added to the United States National Film Registry, having been deemed "culturally, historically or aesthetically significant". It was included, at No. 52, in Bravo's 100 Scariest Movie Moments.

It is listed in the film reference book 1001 Movies You Must See Before You Die.

In the United States, the film is in the public domain because Universal did not renew the copyright in 1953.

See also
 List of early color feature films
 List of films in the public domain in the United States
 Phantom of the Opera (1943 film)
 Universal Monsters

References
Explanatory notes

Citations

External links

 
 
 
 
 
 rare lobby card

1925 films
1925 horror films
1920s color films
1920s monster movies
American monster movies
American silent feature films
American black-and-white films
Films based on The Phantom of the Opera
Films directed by Rupert Julian
Films directed by Edward Sedgwick
Films directed by Lon Chaney
Films about composers
Films based on horror novels
Films set in Paris
Films set in a theatre
Films about opera
Silent films in color
United States National Film Registry films
Universal Pictures films
Articles containing video clips
Gothic horror films
Films with screenplays by Bernard McConville
Films produced by Carl Laemmle
Surviving American silent films
Early color films
Melodrama films
American romantic horror films
American romantic musical films
Halloween fiction
Films about death
Dark fantasy films
American musical fantasy films
American psychological horror films
American serial killer films
1920s English-language films
1920s American films
Silent horror films
Silent American drama films
1920s horror drama films